The Chrism Mass is a religious service held in Roman Catholicism, Lutheranism, and Anglicanism.

The Chrism Mass is one of the most solemn and important liturgies of the Christian liturgical calendar. The ancient Christian Apostolic Tradition (c. 200 A.D.) described a "ceremony taking place during the Easter Vigil at which two holy oils were blessed and one was consecrated." During this rite, two oils were "blessed by the bishop: the oil of the sick and the oil of exorcism". 

Maundy Thursday is the usual day in which this Mass is celebrated in a diocese or archdiocese. During this Mass the Holy Oils are consecrated or blessed.  The Holy Oils are:
 Chrism – used in the sacraments of Baptism, Confirmation and Holy Orders, as well as for the consecration of altars and the dedication of churches.
 the oil of catechumens (formerly known as the oil of exorcism)– also used in the sacrament of Baptism, and
 the Oil of the Sick – used only in the rite of the Anointing of the Sick

The Oil of the Catechumens and  Oil of Chrism are used on Holy Saturday during the Easter Vigil for the baptism and confirmation of adults or children over the age of 10 who wish to fully enter the Church.  

Holy chrism is a mixture of olive oil and balsam, an aromatic resin. Balsam is poured into the oil, which gives it a sweet smell intended to remind those who encounter it of the "odor of sanctity" to which those who are marked with it, are called to strive. The priests concelebrating the mass extend their hands toward the vessel containing the chrism and say the chosen "prayer of consecration" silently as the bishop pronounces it over the chrism.

Traditions by Christian denomination

Catholicism
Anciently, in the Latin Liturgical Tradition, a special Mass – the Chrism Mass – was celebrated on Maundy Thursday.  But, as Dom Prosper Guéranger noted his Liturgical Year (writing in the 1800s), “for now many centuries, this great ceremony is celebrated at the single Mass, which is said on this day in commemoration of our Lord's Supper.” During the Pontificate of Pope Pius XII, a separate Mass for the blessing of the Holy Oils was promulgated. 

The blessing of the Oils is traditionally celebrated in the diocesan/archdiocesan cathedral and generally held on the morning of Maundy Thursday. However, for practical reasons, many dioceses celebrate this mass on another day during Holy Week. It is often the largest annual gathering of clergy and faithful held in most dioceses. In some dioceses, attendance is sufficiently significant that, due to limited seating, tickets are distributed to parishes. The mass is a celebration of the institution of the priesthood with Jesus' words at the Last Supper, "Do this in memory of me." During the mass, all present are called to renew their baptismal promises; priests and deacons (the ordained) are further called to reaffirm their ministry by renewing the promises made at their ordination.

The Mass takes its name from the blessing of the holy oils used in the sacraments throughout the year, which are then given to priests or extraordinary lay ministers to take back to their parishes. During the part of the Chrism Mass called the Rite of Reception of the Oils,  representatives from every diocesan/archdiocesan parish receive the three oils. This signifies each parish's unity with their bishop, archbishop or cardinal. Whenever the holy oils are used, the ministry of the bishop who blessed and consecrated them is symbolically present. The oils distributed are meant to last all year, although extra oil is also blessed during the mass and is kept at the cathedral as a reserve if a parish runs out.

The service is a 1967 restoration of the rite recorded in the early 200s by the historian Hippolytus who writes of a ceremony taking place during the Easter Vigil at which two holy oils were blessed and one was consecrated. In the fifth century, the ceremony of the oils was transferred from the Easter Vigil to Maundy Thursday. A separate mass for that purpose was instituted and made distinct from the Mass of the Lord's Supper. The change took place not only due to the large crowds that assembled for the Easter Vigil on Holy Saturday night, but to fully emphasize Christ's institution of the ordained priesthood during what is traditionally called The Last Supper. In the decree renewing this rite Pope Paul VI said:“The Chrism Mass is one of the principal expressions of the fullness of the bishop’s priesthood and signifies the closeness of the priests with him.”

While the Oil of the Catechumens and the Oil of the Sick, are simply "blessed," the Sacred Chrism is "consecrated".

Lutheranism
On Maundy Thursday, Lutherans celebrate the Chrism Mass, which is presided over by a bishop. In the Chrism Mass, the holy oils are blessed and clergy renew their vows.

Anglicanism
The 1979 BCP (p. 307) calls for chrism to be consecrated by the bishop. This may be done when the bishop is present in the parish for Confirmation. In many dioceses, the consecration of chrism by the bishop may be done at a service of reaffirmation of ordination vows during Holy Week. Similar to the Roman Catholic ritual, during the Chrism Eucharist, the Bishop will bless the oils used throughout the next year for baptisms and healing. In addition, the Bishop and clergy in attendance will reaffirm their Ordination Vows.

References

Anglican liturgy
Holy Week
Lutheran liturgy and worship
Mass in the Catholic Church